Tangi Tehsil is a tehsil located in Charsadda District, Khyber Pakhtunkhwa, Pakistan.

Short history of tehsil Tangi 
During British rule Tangi was part of the old Charsadda Tehsil (then part of Peshawar District) later Tangi became a tehsil in its own right.

Some beautiful and scenic picnic spots are Yousaf baba close to Tangi, CHOPAAL-Restaurant Tangi (Chawatra) and Kanewar famous for Chappli Kabab.Munda head and munda dam,Tangi irrigation canal,Tangi jendi bridge, Tangi tatono bridge and many more beautiful places. 

If Tangi is called the main fort & stronghold of Muhammadzai tribe.it will not be wrong.Because more than 80% of the population here belong to the Muhammadzai tribe.

There are also graves of many saints in Tangi. Among them are Sharo mian Sahib,Nika Sahib,Muhammadzai Nika Mazar,Yusuf Baba etc.

Some of the notable personalities of Tangi are. Maulana Rehmat ullah jan saib, Maulana Muhammad Akbar (Gandhiri Maulvi Sahib) graduated from Deoband. Shodago Babaji,Malik Muhammad Akram barzai as well as many famous people including Khan Abdul Akbar Khan, Wawa Khan,Malik Muqarab khan,Gul Shahzada alias Gul saib, khan bahadur Mir Alam Khan.

A notable achievement for Tangi came on 25 March 2018 when Dr. Nadeem Jan resident of Tangi Nusratzai Mohallah Fateh Kheil was awarded the prestigious award of Tamgha e Imtiaz https://en.wikipedia.org/wiki/Tamgha-e-Imtiaz by the president of Islamic Republic of Pakistan. This was the first time in the history of entire District Charsadda and Thesil Tangi that such honour has been earned by its resident.

The tehsil is administratively subdivided into 12 Union Councils, one of which form the headquarters - Tangi.

 Tangi MC
 Hisara Nehri
 Sherpao
 Ziam
 Abazai
 Mirzadher

 Koz Behraam Dheri
 Ghan Dheri
 Mandani
 Dakki
 Shodag
 Harichand

Population 
The population of Tangi Tehsil, according 2017 consensus, is 428,239 while according 1998 consensus, it was 254,461. The population of Tangi Tehsil, according to official consensus, over the years is shown in the table below.

See also 
 Charsadda District
 Charsadda Tehsil
 Shabqadar Tehsil

References

Charsadda District, Pakistan
Tehsils of Khyber Pakhtunkhwa